His Final Work is an album credited to Charles Mingus, released in 1977. His Final Work is a reissue of Lionel Hampton Presents Charles Mingus, released in 1977, which was also reissued as The Music of Charles Mingus and credited to Lionel Hampton. His Final Work comprises the final recording session that Mingus played an instrument on. Shortly after the completion of the recording sessions, Mingus was diagnosed with Amyotrophic lateral sclerosis which would lead to his death. The album features arrangements of Mingus's compositions by Paul Jeffrey.

Mingus changed the title of his composition about Nelson Rockefeller's handling of the Attica Prison riot, "Remember Rockefeller at Attica", to "Just for Laughs" to disguise the piece from Hampton who was friends with Rockefeller and a supporter of the Republican Party.

From the liner notes 
Charles Mingus was unique. His influences were eclectic, ranging from New Orleans jazz through swing, bop and Latin to modern classical and avant-garde. Although his playing was strong and impressive, it's his writing and approach to making music that put him in a league of his own. By the mid 1950s he had worked out a totally personal way of getting his musical vision across, which involved his "dictating" parts to musicians, but at the same time leaving plenty of room for individual expression. At the same time it was this massive energy and enormous presence that served to turn what could have become musical chaos in to some of the most distinctive and remarkable music ever produced in jazz.

This CD, one of the last records of his work, demonstrates all of Mingus's abilities, his writing, his playing, and his ability to organise an ensemble. He had a great respect for the traditions of the music, and so we find Lionel Hampton who, at the time of this recording was almost 70, under Mingus's watchful eye producing some of his best playing of that era. The band itself is full of fine players, notably Mingus's old friend and ally Dannie Richmond on drums, and watch out for another jazz great hidden amongst the horns, the remarkable Gerry Mulligan on baritone sax. It speaks volumes for the respect in which Mingus was held that players such as Hampton and Mulligan would turn out for him. This would be one of the last recording dates that Mingus would actively participate in, and one feels that all the players on this album really wanted to "do it" for him. The soloing is universally strong, the feel of each of the tracks is typically Mingus, and the whole thing serves as a masterful tribute to a great, if highly complex, man and musician.

Track listing
All compositions by Charles Mingus.

Personnel
 Gerry Mulligan – baritone saxophone
 Charles Mingus – double bass
 Dannie Richmond – drums
 Robert W. Schachner – executive producer
 Peter Matt – french horn
 Alun Morgan – liner notes
 Bob Neloms – piano
 Lionel Hampton – vibraphone, producer
 Ricky Ford – tenor saxophone
 Paul Jeffrey – tenor saxophone, arranger
 Jack Walrath, Woody Shaw – trumpet

References

1977 albums
Charles Mingus albums
Lionel Hampton albums
Who's Who in Jazz albums